"High Class Baby" is a song by Cliff Richard and the Drifters (who would later become the Shadows), released in November 1958 as their second single. It peaked at number 7 on the UK Singles Chart.

Recording and reception
"High Class Baby" was written by Ian Samwell about actress Julie Cracknell, mother of singer Sarah Cracknell, who had spurned his advances.

Both sides were recorded on 3 October 1958 at EMI Studios (later renamed Abbey Road Studios), two days before Cliff Richard and the Drifters went on tour for the first time. Like with "Move It", producer Norrie Paramor hired session musicians Ernie Shear and Frank Clarke to play on the record. However, Richard has said that "it didn't compare in any way to "Move It"" and that he cried when he got home, believing that his career was over.

"Don't Bug Me Baby", originally by little-known American singer Milton Allen, was intended to be the follow-up to "Move It". However, it was shelved in favour of "High Class Baby" after a disjointed recording of it and because it was felt that "High Class Baby" had a more "British sound" to it. "Don't Bug Me Baby was later re-recorded for Richard's debut studio album Cliff Sings.

After its release, "High Class Baby" was banned by the BBC, as the lyrics mention a Cadillac car, which the BBC saw as a breach of advertising regulations. 

Reviewing for Disc, Don Nicholl described "High Class Baby" as "a furious rock number that will rattle the teeth in your head; it is put out like a machine-gun gone " and has "plenty of twangy guitar in the rhythm backing".

Track listing
 "High Class Baby" – 2:09
 "My Feet Hit the Ground" – 1:59

Personnel
 Cliff Richard – vocals
 Ian Samwell – guitar
 Ernie Shear – guitar
 Frank Clarke – upright bass
 Terry Smart – drums

Charts

Cover versions 

 In 1961, a Spanish-language version, titled "Presumida", by Mexican band Los Teen Tops was a number-one hit in Mexico.

References

1958 singles
1958 songs
Cliff Richard songs
Songs written by Ian Samwell
Columbia Graphophone Company singles
Song recordings produced by Norrie Paramor
Songs banned by the BBC